Baisha is a town of Hejiang County, Sichuan, China. , it has two residential communities and seven villages under its administration.

References

Towns in Sichuan
Hejiang County